Kim Dong-soo (born October 27, 1968) is a former professional baseball catcher and current manager of the futures (general 2nd) LG Twins of the KBO League.

References

External links
Career statistics and player information from the KBO League

LG Twins coaches
Kiwoom Heroes coaches
Kiwoom Heroes players
Hyundai Unicorns players
SSG Landers players
Samsung Lions players
LG Twins players
KBO League catchers
South Korean baseball players
KBO League Rookie of the Year Award winners
Baseball players at the 1988 Summer Olympics
Olympic baseball players of South Korea
Hanyang University alumni
Seoul High School alumni
Baseball players from Seoul
1968 births
Living people
Gimhae Kim clan